This is a list of islands in Papua New Guinea, as to most of its 600 main islands, by province listed NW to SE.

East Sepik Province 
(No. 5 on the map)
 Schouten Islands, a loose group of islands off the coast of the East Sepik Province
 Tarawai (Tandanie) Island
 Walis (Walifu) Island
 Karesau Island
 Mushu Island
 Kairiru Island
 Yuo Island
 Rabuin Island
 Unei Island
 Wogeo Island
 Koil Island
 Wei (or Vial) Island
 Blupblup Island
 Kadowar Island
 Bam Island

Sandaun Province
(No. 19 on the map)
Tumleo Island
 Ali Island
 Seleo Island
 Angel Island

Manus Province
(No. 9 on the map)

 Admiralty Islands, group of 18 islands including:
 Manus Island, main island
 Los Negros Island
 Lou Island
 Ndrova Island
 Tong Island
 Baluan Island
 Pak Island
 Purdy Islands
 Rambutyo Island
 St. Andrews Islands
 Western Islands, with:
 Aua Island
 Hermit Islands
 Kaniet Islands (Anchorite)
 Sae Island
 Ninigo Islands
 Wuvulu Island

New Ireland Province 
(No. 12 on the map)
 New Ireland
 Baudisson Island
 Manne Island
 Selapiu Island
 New Hanover or Lavongai
 Saint Matthias Group
 Tabar Group
 Lihir Group
 Tanga Group
 Feni Islands
 Ambitle
 Babase Island
 Dyaul Island

West New Britain Province 
(No. 18 on the map)
 New Britain or also Niu Briten, main island
 Vitu Islands

East New Britain Province 

(No. 4 on the map)
 New Britain or also Niu Briten, main island
 Watom Island
 Matupi Island
 Duke of York Islands
 Duke of York Island
 Kabakon
Kerawara
 Makada
 Mioko Island
Mualim Island
 Ulu

Madang Province 
(No 8 on the map)
 Long Island
 Crown Island
 Karkar Island
 Bagabag Island
 Manam

Morobe Province 
(No. 11 on the map)
 Umboi Island
 Tolokiwa Island
 Sakar Island
 Ritter Island
 Malai Island
 Tuam Island

Autonomous Region of Bougainville
(No. 14 on map)
 Bougainville
 Buka Island
 Green Islands
 Barahun Island
 Nissan Island
 Pinipel Island
 Sirot Island
 Sau Island

Western Province
(No. 16 on map)

 Daru Island
 Bristow Island
 Kawai Islands
 Kawa Island
 Karobailo Kawa Island
 Mata Kawa Island
 Parama Island
 Kiwai Island
 Purutu Island
 Wabuda Island

Gulf Province
(No. 7 on map)
 Morigio Island
 Neabo Island
 Goaribari Island
 Urama Island

National Capital District
(No. 20 on map)
 Daugo Island
 Manubada Island
 Haidana Island
• Loloata Islands

Milne Bay Province

(No. 10 on the map)
 South Coast Islands
 Bona Bona 
 Brumer Islands
 Baliabedabeda Bonarua
 Halioya
 Deirina 
 Trobriand Islands
 Kiriwina
 Kaileuna
 Vakuta
 Kitava

 D'Entrecasteaux Islands
 Fergusson Island
 Goodenough Island
 Normanby Island (Papua New Guinea)
 Sanaroa Island
 Dobu Island
 Sori (or Wild) Island
 Woodlark Islands
 Woodlark Island
 Madau
 Louisiade Archipelago

 Samarai Islands
 Basilaki Island
 Beika Island
 Bonarua Hili Hili Island
 Buiari Island
 Castori Islets
 Dagadaga Bonarua Island
 Deka Deka Island
 Didigilo Island
 Dinana Island
 Doini Island
 Ebuma Island
 Gado-Gadoa Island
 Galahi Island
 Gesila Island
 Gonabarabara Island
 Grant Island
 Igwali Island
 Ito Island
 Kitai Bai Island
 Kato Katoa Island
 Kitai Bona Bona Island
 Kitai Katu Island
 Kitai Lilivea Island
 Kui Island
 Kwai Ama Island
 Kwato Island
 Lesimano Island
 Logea Island
 Nasariri Island
 Populai Island
 Samarai
 Sariba Island
 Sideia Island
 Sripkunui Island
 Tuyam Island
 Wasima Island
 Bentley Islands
 Anagusa
 Nare
 Bonvouloir Islands
 East Island, Papua New Guinea
 Strathord Islands
 Hastings Island (Papua New Guinea)
 Calvados Chain
 Panasia
 Sloss Islands
 Utian Island
 Pana Rora Island
 Pana Udu Udi
 Gulewa Island
 Ululina Island
 Venariwa Island
 Motorina
 Bonna Wan
 Bagaman Island
 Bobo Eina Island
 Pana Numara
 Yaruman
 Panangaribu
 Panatinane Island
 Kuwanak Island
 Gigila
 Pana Wina Island
 Hemenahei Island
 Conflict Group
 Auriroa Island
 Gabugabutau Island
 Ginara Island
 Irai Island
 Itamarina Island
 Lunn Island
 Moniara Island
 Panaboal Island
 Panarakuum Island
 Panasesa Island
 Quesal Island
 Tupit Island
 Deboyne Islands
 Losai Island; Nibub Island; Nivani Island
 Pana Uya Wana; Panaeati; Panapompom
 Passage Island
 Rara Island
 Duchateau Islands
 Jomard Islands
 Kukuluba Island
 Montemont Islands
 Pana Bobai Ana
 Pana Rura Wara
 Dumoulin Islands
 Ana Karu Karua
 Baiiri
 Duperre Islands
 Duperre Island
 Punawan
 East Deboyne Islands
 Basses Group; Bushy Islets; Mabui Island
 Pana Sagasagu; Redlick Islets
 Engineer Islands
 Bright Island; Butchart Island; Button Island
 Deedes Island; Flat Island; Good Island; Haszard Island		
 Hummock Island
 Messum Island; Pender Island; Powell Island
 Skelton Island; Slade Island; Watts Island
 Laseinie Islands
 Dawson Island, Kagawan Island; Keaawan Island
 Hardman Islands
 Misima Island
 Daloloia Group
 Pana Tinani Islands
 Nimoa Island
 Pana Tinani
 Wanim Island
 Yeina Island
 Daddahai Island; Hevaisi Island; Osasai Island; Sibumbum Island
 Renard Islands
Baiwa; Kimuta; Manuga Reef; Oreia
 Rossel Islands
 Diama
 Pocklington Reef
 Rossel Island
 Wule Island
 Torlesse Islands	
 Pananiu Island
 Tinolan
 Vanatinai Islands
 Boboa Island
 Iyen Island
 Tagula Island also known as Vanatinai Island and Sudest Island
 Venama
 Wari Islands
 Imbert Island
 Kosman Reef
 Lebrun Islands	
 Long Island	
 Quessant Island	
 Sable Island	
 Siga Island	
 Stuers Islands	
 Wari Island

References

Papua New Guinea